Isaiah Nigel Johnson (born October 14, 1992) is an American football safety who is a free agent. He played in the NFL for the Tampa Bay Buccaneers from 2016 to 2019. He played college football at South Carolina and Kansas.

Early life
Isaiah Johnson was born on October 14, 1992, and grew up in Piscataway, New Jersey. He moved to Cary, North Carolina in 2007 where he attended Panther Creek High School. He lettered and played four years of varsity basketball and football for the Catamounts. He was named first-team all conference in football and in basketball his senior year.

College career
Initially Isaiah Johnson attended Western Carolina but was granted a medical redshirt. In 2012 he played for Iowa Western Community College where he finished second in the nation in interceptions and helped lead them to an NJCAA National Championship.  Johnson then played at Kansas. In 2013 Johnson played safety at Kansas and finished second on the team in tackles with 73 total tackles, and also had 5 interceptions. Johnson was named Big 12 Defensive Newcomer of the Year. In 2014, Johnson was second on the team in tackles again with 75 total tackles, and also had 1 interception. Johnson graduated from Kansas with a degree in sociology and then transferred to South Carolina to play college football for his final season of eligibility. At South Carolina in 2015, Johnson was named one of the team captains in only attending the school for 5 months. Johnson finished his final season of college football at South Carolina as the second leading tackler with 74 tackles and an interception.

Overall, Johnson started all 36 of his career Division 1 college football games.

Professional career

Tampa Bay Buccaneers
Johnson was signed by the Tampa Bay Buccaneers as an undrafted free agent on May 2, 2016. He was released on September 3, 2016, during final roster cuts and was signed to the practice squad. He spent the entire season on the practice squad and signed a reserve/future contract with the Buccaneers on January 2, 2017.

On September 2, 2017, Johnson was waived by the Buccaneers and was signed to the practice squad the next day. He was promoted to the active roster on October 5, 2017. He was waived on October 24, 2017, and re-signed to the practice squad. He was promoted back to the active roster on December 20, 2017.

On September 4, 2018, Isaiah Johnson makes the 53 man roster.

On March 10, 2019, Tampa Bay Buccaneers extend tender to Johnson. The Buccaneers extended a tender to Johnson on Friday, Scott Smith of the team's official site reports. Johnson spent his first two years in the league unable to maintain a consistent role with a team, but he was on the active roster for all 16 games in 2018, recording 48 tackles and an interception. His contract tender basically guarantees he'll be with the Buccaneers in 2019, and he'll likely stick in a similar reserve role since Justin Evans and Jordan Whitehead are still under contract.

On April 5, 2019, Johnson signed his exclusive rights tender prior to the start of offseason workouts Monday, Scott Smith of the Buccaneers' official site reports. The undrafted free agent played in 15 games during the 2018 season, logging four starts. Johnson acquitted himself well over that span, posting 48 tackles (40 solo), two passes defensed, one interception and one fumble recovery. In addition to serving as valuable depth in the secondary, Johnson also played extensively on special teams. Looking ahead to 2019, Johnson will look to reprise both roles under new coordinators Todd Bowles and Keith Armstrong, respectively.

On August 31, 2019, Johnson was released by the Buccaneers.

Winnipeg Blue Bombers
Johnson signed with the Winnipeg Blue Bombers on February 28, 2020. After the CFL canceled the 2020 season due to the COVID-19 pandemic, Johnson chose to opt-out of his contract with the Blue Bombers on August 27, 2020.

Personal life
Isaiah Johnson was born in Montclair, New Jersey. He grew up with his three brothers Dominick, Najir, and Chris Johnson in New Jersey. His parents are Mary and Chris Johnson. Johnson later moved to Cary, North Carolina where he attended Panther Creek High School. He is cousins with former NFL player for the New York Giants Keith Hamilton. He is also cousins with Keith's son Darius Hamilton.

References

External links
 South Carolina Gamecocks bio
 Tampa Bay Buccaneers Tender
 CBS SPORTS
 Kansas Jayhawks Bio
NJCAA Stats

1992 births
Living people
American football safeties
Iowa Western Reivers football players
Kansas Jayhawks football players
People from Cary, North Carolina
Players of American football from North Carolina
South Carolina Gamecocks football players
Tampa Bay Buccaneers players
Western Carolina Catamounts football players
Winnipeg Blue Bombers players